Kate Clanchy MBE (born 1965 in Glasgow, Scotland) is a British poet, freelance writer and teacher.

Early life
She was born in 1965 in Glasgow to medieval historian Michael Clanchy and teacher Joan Clanchy (née Milne). She was educated at George Watson's College in Edinburgh and at the University of Oxford, where she studied English.

Career
She lived in London's East End for several years, before moving to Oxfordshire where she now works as a teacher, journalist and freelance writer.

Her poetry and seven radio plays have been broadcast by BBC Radio. She is a regular contributor to The Guardian newspaper; her work appeared in The Scotsman, the New Statesman and Poetry Review. She also writes for radio and broadcasts on the BBC's World Service, Radio 3 and Radio 4. She is a Creative Writing Fellow of Oxford Brookes University and teaches Creative Writing at the Arvon Foundation. She is currently one of the writers-in-residence at the charity First Story. Her poetry has been included in A Book of Scottish Verse (2002)  and The Edinburgh book of twentieth-century Scottish poetry (2006). Clanchy was appointed an MBE in 2018.

Book controversy 

In August 2021, Clanchy announced that she would rewrite her book Some Kids I Taught and What They Taught Me after passages from it were criticised online for their depictions of ethnic minority, autistic and working class children, including use of terms described by some as "dehumanising", "racist", "anti-Black", and "antisemitic". Detractors included fellow writers Dara McAnulty, Monisha Rajesh, Sunny Singh and Chimene Suleyman. Clanchy was defended by the writers Amanda Craig and Philip Pullman.

Clanchy had initially claimed, incorrectly, that the extracts concerned were "all made up", then argued that the quotes, which she described as "racist", had been taken out of context. Clanchy later issued a statement apologising for "overreacting" to the critiques and stating that she "got many things wrong, and welcome[d] the chance to write better, more lovingly". Later, however, she seemed to retract her agreement to rewrite, in an article she wrote for Unherd accusing the publisher's sensitivity readers of having "sullied" her memoir.

Prizes and awards
1994   Eric Gregory Award
1997   Forward Poetry Prize (Best First Collection) for Slattern
1996   London Arts Board New Writer Award
1996   Saltire Society Scottish First Book of the Year Award for Slattern
1996   Scottish Arts Council Book Award for  Slattern
1997   Mail on Sunday/John Llewellyn Rhys Prize   (shortlist) for Slattern
1997   Somerset Maugham Award for  Slattern
1999   Forward Poetry Prize (Best Poetry Collection of the Year)   (shortlist) for Samarkand
1999   Scottish Arts Council Book Award for Samarkand
2004   Forward Poetry Prize (Best Poetry Collection of the Year)   (shortlist) for Newborn
2009   Scottish Arts Council Book Award for What Is She Doing Here?: A Refugee's Story
2009    Writers' Guild Award for Best Book (What is She Doing Here)
2009   BBC National Short Story Award for The Not-Dead and The Saved
2013  Costa Book Awards (First Novel), shortlisted for Meeting the English
2018  Cholmondeley Award
2020  Orwell Prize for Political Writing for Some Kids I Taught and What They Taught Me

Bibliography
 1st edition Chatto & Windus, 1995

 (editor)
 1st edition Picador, 2004

References

External links
 "Kate Clanchy", British Council
 "‘Cool in my forties’: Kate Clanchy in conversation with Vicki Bertram", Horizon Review, Volume 2
 "The Girl from Nowhere: John Stammers interviews Kate Clanchy". Magma No 9 - Spring 1997  
 "Poet Kate Clanchy wins BBC National Short Story award". Guardian article. 7 December 2009
 A review to 'La testa di Shakila' by  Andrea Galgano. Città del Monte italian article about Kate Clanchy. 2 September 2019

1965 births
Living people
Fellows of the Royal Society of Literature
Scottish women poets
Scottish women dramatists and playwrights
20th-century Scottish poets
20th-century Scottish dramatists and playwrights
20th-century Scottish women writers
21st-century Scottish poets
21st-century Scottish dramatists and playwrights
21st-century Scottish women writers
Alumni of the University of Edinburgh
Alumni of the University of Oxford
Writers from Glasgow